The American Can Company was a manufacturer of tin cans. It was a member of the Tin Can Trust, that controlled a "large percentage of business in the United States in tin cans, containers, and packages of tin." American Can Company ranked 97th among United States corporations in the value of World War II military production contracts. During its peak of productivity, the American Can Company employed up to 800 people from the surrounding neighborhoods. It was a member of the Dow Jones Industrial Average from 1959 to 1991, though after 1987 it had renamed itself Primerica, a financial conglomerate which had divested itself of its packaging arm in 1986.

Primerica, after it was merged with Sanford I. Weill's Commercial Credit Company, would form the basis of what would become Citigroup.

In the early 1980s American Can renamed itself and ended its operations in Greenwich.

History
The American Can Company was incorporated in 1901.

In 1904, the American Can Company of Greenwich, Connecticut bought the small Norton Can Company that had operated since 1887 at York and Bay Streets (Toronto,  Ontario). The company expanded further in 1908 when it bought the Sanitary Can Company of Niagara Falls and the Acme Can Works in Montreal.  For many years, the American Can Company was Canada's largest producer of tin cans 

In 1957, Dixie cup merged with the American Can Company.
The James River Corporation of Virginia purchased American Can's paper business in 1982. The assets of James River are now part of Georgia-Pacific, a subsidiary of Koch Industries, the second largest privately owned company in the United States.

In 1985, Nelson Peltz's New York-based Triangle Industries bought the National Can Company for $460 million. The same year, it acquired the Dunham's Sports athletic store chain and made it part of its retail sector, which also included Musicland and Fingerhut.

In 1986, it acquired the packaging division of Gerald Tsai's American Can Company for $570 million.

In 1987 American Can announced that it would change its 86-year-old name to "Primerica".

In 1988, Pechiney S.A., the French metal conglomerate, acquired Triangle Industries. At the time of the buyout, American National Can was the largest can company in the United States. Rexam acquired American National Can's metal can business in 2000.

American Can was formed as Phoenix Can commenced upon a Mergers and Acquisition program to consolidate competitors and named the newly created entity American Can.

Facilities

 Arlington, Texas 
 Carson, California 
Dade City, Florida
New York, New York
Fairport, New York
Cincinnati, Ohio
Baltimore, Maryland
Brisbane, California
Chatham, Ontario
Fair Lawn, New Jersey
Geneva, New York
Greensboro, North Carolina
Hammond, Indiana
Hillside, New Jersey
Edison, New Jersey
Dayton, New Jersey
Jersey City, New Jersey
Lemoyne, Pennsylvania
Lubec, Maine
Milwaukee, Wisconsin
Montreal, Quebec
Needham Heights, Massachusetts
New Orleans, Louisiana
Ogden, Utah
Pevely, Missouri
Philadelphia, Pennsylvania
Portland, Maine
Portland, Oregon
Richmond, Virginia
Saint Louis, Missouri
Sacramento, California
Saint Paul, Minnesota
San Francisco, California
San Jose, California
Seattle, Washington
 Shelbyville, Tennessee
Simcoe, Ontario
Vancouver, British Columbia
Honolulu, Hawaii 
Washington, New Jersey
Sacramento, California
Chicago, Illinois
Maywood, Illinois
San Antonio, Texas
Tampa, Florida
Glendale, California

See also

 Primerica

References

External links

 

 
Former components of the Dow Jones Industrial Average
Citigroup
Primerica
American companies established in 1901
Companies based in Greenwich, Connecticut
Canned food
Manufacturing companies established in 1901
1901 establishments in New York City